Aam panna or Aam Jhora()  is an Indian drink renowned for its cooling properties. It is made from unripe mangoes and is yellow to light green in color, and is consumed to fight against the intense Indian summer heat. Mint leaves are often added to the drink, enhancing its green color.

Raw mango is a rich source of pectin, which gradually diminishes after the formation of the stone. Unripe mango is sour in taste because of the presence of oxalic, citric and malic acids.

Aam panna or Aam Jhora, which is prepared using raw mangoes, cumin, and an assortment of other spices, quenches thirst and prevents the excessive loss of sodium chloride and iron during summer due to excessive sweating. The drink is mainly consumed in north India and is considered beneficial in the treatment of gastrointestinal disorders. It is also a good source of vitamin B1 and B2, niacin, and vitamin C. In Indian culture, it is regarded as a tonic believed to increase resistance against tuberculosis, anemia, cholera and dysentery.

See also
 List of Indian beverages

References

Indian drinks
Rajasthani cuisine
Uttar Pradeshi cuisine